Blepharipa is a genus of flies in the family Tachinidae.

Species
B. albocinta (Mesnil, 1956)
B. carbonata (Mesnil, 1970)
B. chaetoparafacialis Chao, 1982
B. fimbriata (Wulp, 1890)
B. fusiformis (Walker, 1849)
B. gigas (Mesnil, 1950)
B. jacobsoni (Townsend, 1927)
B. latigena (Mesnil, 1970)
B. nigrina (Mesnil, 1970)
B. orbitalis (Townsend, 1927)
B. pratensis (Meigen, 1824)
B. schineri (Mesnil, 1939)
B. sericariae (Rondani, 1870)
B. sugens (Wiedemann, 1830)
B. tibialis (Chao, 1963)
B. wainwrighti (Baranov, 1932)
B. zebina (Walker, 1849)

References

Tachinidae genera
Exoristinae
Taxa named by Camillo Rondani